North Fair Oaks is a census-designated place and an unincorporated area located in San Mateo County, California adjacent to Redwood City, Atherton, and Menlo Park.  As of the 2020 census the area had a total population of 14,027. Because of the large number of residents from one Mexican state the area is also known as Little Michoacán.  The larger area including North Fair Oaks and adjacent parts of Redwood City has a large Latino population and is known locally as Little Mexico. The neighborhood is distinctive, as it is one out of only three communities (the others being East Palo Alto and Pescadero) in San Mateo County that have a majority Hispanic population.

History 
Fair Oaks was a residential area north of Menlo Park. In 1923, Menlo Park attempted to incorporate Fair Oaks first, but instead, Fair Oaks incorporated separately as the town of Atherton (see Atherton for details and history). This left North Fair Oaks unincorporated.

One of the two Hetch Hetchy Aqueduct utility corridors on the San Francisco Peninsula was installed through the area at an angle diagonal to the existing street grid.

Geography and climate
North Fair Oaks is located at  (37.475170, -122.203506).

Proximity to mountains by the Pacific coast and the San Francisco Bay creates a microclimate that makes the area frequently sunny and warm with temperatures moderated by ocean and bay breezes.  Similar conditions are found on the Canary Islands and the Mediterranean Coast of North Africa.  This local microclimate is centered on nearby Redwood City which claims the slogan "climate best by government test".

Law and government 
Essential services are provided through San Mateo County by the Board of Supervisors using input from the North Fair Oaks Community Council.  They also are included in the boundaries of the Sequoia Healthcare District which provides health care benefits supported by property taxes collected from District residents. http://www.sequoiahealthcaredistrict.com/

Children attend elementary school in the Redwood City School District but then attend Menlo-Atherton High School within the Sequoia Union High School District.

Demographics
The 2010 United States Census reported that North Fair Oaks had a population of 14,687. The racial makeup of North Fair Oaks was 7,060 (48.1%) White, 235 (1.6%) African American, 143 (1.0%) Native American, 548 (3.7%) Asian, 219 (1.5%) Pacific Islander, 5,728 (39.0%) from other races, and 754 (5.1%) from two or more races. Hispanic or Latino of any race were 10,731 persons (73.1%).

The Census reported that 14,367 people (97.8% of the population) lived in households, 314 (2.1%) lived in non-institutionalized group quarters, and 6 (0%) were institutionalized.

There were 3,919 households, out of which 1,928 (49.2%) had children under the age of 18 living in them, 2,033 (51.9%) were opposite-sex married couples living together, 548 (14.0%) had a female householder with no husband present, 350 (8.9%) had a male householder with no wife present.  There were 324 (8.3%) unmarried opposite-sex partnerships, and 45 (1.1%) same-sex married couples or partnerships. 629 households (16.1%) were made up of individuals, and 175 (4.5%) had someone living alone who was 65 years of age or older. The average household size was 3.67.  There were 2,931 families (74.8% of all households); the average family size was 3.93.

The population was spread out, with 4,075 people (27.7%) under the age of 18, 1,557 people (10.6%) aged 18 to 24, 4,990 people (34.0%) aged 25 to 44, 3,097 people (21.1%) aged 45 to 64, and 968 people (6.6%) who were 65 years of age or older.  The median age was 31.0 years. For every 100 females, there were 113.0 males.  For every 100 females age 18 and over, there were 115.0 males.

The homeowner vacancy rate was 1.0%; the rental vacancy rate was 5.1%.  5,997 people (40.8% of the population) lived in owner-occupied housing units and 8,370 people (57.0%) lived in rental housing units.

Politics

The community is mostly Democratic, with 58% registered Democrats and 19% registered Republicans as of 02/2002.

Community
The Fair Oaks Beautification Association is an active element of the North Fair Oaks community. FOBA is a not-for-profit 501c3 organization that has raised funds to plant trees and install traffic-calming devices throughout the neighborhood. Its primary activity is to maintain the neighborhood park at Edison Way and Fair Oaks Avenue. This park is built over the Hetch Hetchy Aqueduct and was installed with permission of the SFPUC. Construction and maintenance are made possible by grants and community contributions, with substantial volunteer effort provided by members of the community.

The North Fair Oaks Festival is a popular summer event.

References

Census-designated places in San Mateo County, California
Census-designated places in California